The State of His Art is a studio album by American composer/arranger/pianist Clare Fischer, recorded May 1973 and released in 1976 by Revelation Records, and on CD by Clare Fischer Productions in 2007. This is the first of five strictly solo piano recordings Fischer would make during his career.

Track listing
All compositions by Clare Fischer except where indicated.
 "The Duke"
 "Someday My Prince Will Come" (Frank Churchill-Larry Morey)
 "Woody N' You" (Dizzy Gillespie)
 "Free Improvisation"
 "Basic Blues"
 "Proto-Blues"
 "Phrygian Blues"
 "Out-of-Tempo Blues"

Personnel
Clare Fischer - piano

Notes

References 

1976 albums
Clare Fischer albums
Instrumental albums
Revelation Records (jazz) albums